Marianne Qvist (Jørgensen) is a Danish curler and World Champion. She won a gold medal at the 1982 World Curling Championships, and a bronze medal at the 1981 European Curling Championships.

References

External links
 

Living people
Danish female curlers
World curling champions
Year of birth missing (living people)